Penicillium raciborskii is an anamorph species of fungus in the genus Penicillium which was isolated from soil in Poland .

References

raciborskii
Fungi described in 1927